The Flaminio Obelisk (Italian: Obelisco Flaminio) is one of the thirteen ancient obelisks in Rome, Italy. It is located in the Flaminio quarter on Piazza del Popolo.

It is 24 m (67 ft) high and with the base and the cross reaches 36.50 m (100 ft).

History
The Nineteenth Dynasty pharaoh Seti I quarried this obelisk from granite quarries in Aswan. Before his death, artists inscribed three of the four faces of the obelisk, which Seti intended to erect in the Temple of Re in Heliopolis. Seti's son and successor Ramesses II completed its inscriptions and set it up in Heliopolis. 

It was brought to Rome in 10 BC by command of Augustus, together with the Obelisk of Montecitorio, and placed on the spina of the Circus Maximus, followed three centuries later by the Lateran Obelisk. Like most Egyptian obelisks, the Flaminio Obelisk was probably one of a pair. Its companion might have been  but no trace of its companion has been found. In Seti I's dedicatory inscription on one side of the shaft, the king boasts that he would "fill Heliopolis with obelisks." 

The obelisk was rediscovered in 1587, broken into three pieces, together with the Lateran Obelisk; and was erected in the Piazza del Popolo by Domenico Fontana in 1589, at the command of Pope Sixtus V. Sixtus had the Septizodium demolished to provide the travertine for the obelisk's pedestal, among other building projects.

In 1823, Giuseppe Valadier embellished it with a base having four circular basins and stone lions, imitating the Egyptian style.

See also

List of obelisks in Rome
List of Egyptian obelisks

References

Bibliography 
 
 
 
 Cesare D'Onofrio, Gli obelischi di Roma, Bulzoni, 1967
L'Italia. Roma (guida rossa), Touring Club Italiano, Milano 2004
 Armin Wirsching, Obelisken transportieren und aufrichten in Aegypten und in Rom, Norderstedt 2007 (2nd ed. 2010),

External links

Buildings and structures in Rome
Seti I
Ramesses II
Obelisks in Rome
Ancient Egyptian obelisks
Rome R. IV Campo Marzio
Relocated Egyptian obelisks